Shyqyri is an Albanian masculine given name and may refer to:
Shyqyri Ballgjini (born 1954), Albanian footballer
Shyqri Nimani (born 1941), Albanian graphic designer
Shyqyri Rreli (1930–2019), Albanian footballer
Shyqyri Shala (born 1965), Albanian footballer 

Albanian masculine given names